Rosen Kirilov (born 4 January 1973 in Vidin) is a Bulgarian retired professional footballer who played as a defender, and later managed various clubs.

He played as a centre-back for the Bulgaria national team, CSKA Sofia, Litex Lovech, Adanaspor, APOP Kinyras and Vaslui.

Career
Kirilov moved at the age of 18 from Bdin Vidin to CSKA Sofia in 1991. His first competitive game for the club was against Etar Veliko Tarnovo at Ivaylo Stadium on 10 November 1991 which CSKA lost 1–0.

Kirilov made 51 appearances for the Bulgarian national team from 1998 to 2006. He was part of the squads at the 1998 World Cup and Euro 2004.

Career statistics

Club

Honours
CSKA Sofia
Bulgarian League: 1991–92
Bulgarian Cup: 1992–93

Litex Lovech
Bulgarian League: 1997–98
Bulgarian Cup: 2003–04

References

External links
Player Profile at National-Football-Teams

1973 births
Living people
Bulgarian footballers
Bulgaria international footballers
OFC Bdin Vidin players
PFC CSKA Sofia players
PFC Litex Lovech players
Adanaspor footballers
APOP Kinyras FC players
FC Vaslui players
1998 FIFA World Cup players
UEFA Euro 2004 players
Bulgarian expatriate footballers
Expatriate footballers in Turkey
Bulgarian expatriate sportspeople in Turkey
Expatriate footballers in Cyprus
Expatriate footballers in Romania
First Professional Football League (Bulgaria) players
Liga I players
Süper Lig players
Cypriot First Division players
Association football defenders
Bulgarian football managers
People from Vidin